Shubhavi Arya is an Indian animator and film director.

She is most noted for creating cutout stop-motion animated film Adventures of Malia at a young age of 16 years. 

In 2015, she directed and animated the Adventures of Malia which got nominated for 11 international film awards, winning 3 of them including the Honorary Mention Foreign Film Award at the ColorTape International Film Festival, Australia and Best Under 18 Filmmaker at the Global Independent Film Awards, United States.

Early life and background 
Shubhavi Arya was born in New Delhi, India. Shubhavi's father, Jaibir Singh Arya, is an Indian Administrative Service Officer and her mother, Minakshi Arya, is a veterinary surgeon, both of whom work in the Government of India. Her mother, Minakshi Arya, also holds an MBA and M.S. in Software Engineering from North Dakota State University. She has one younger brother, Saatvik Arya.

Education 
Shubhavi Arya is currently studying for dual bachelor of science degrees in computer science and psychology at the University of Minnesota. Shubhavi Arya used to study at the Canadian International School in Singapore in grade 9 and 10. She was home-schooled in grades 11 and 12. She pursued Edexcel International A-Levels as a private candidate. Her A-Level subjects include Math, Physics, Chemistry, Biology and Business Studies. In June 2015 at the age of 16 years in grade 11, she took A-Level examination in Mathematics and achieved A* grade. She also took AS Level examination in Physics and received A grade. She is also currently studying Swedish language.

Shubhavi received full merit based scholarship worth S$63,962 at the Canadian International School, Singapore in grades 9 and 10 in 2012 which is the highest scholarship received by an Indian high school student. She was also the recipient of the Academic Scholarship for grades 11 and 12 worth S$10,000 at the German European School, Singapore in 2014. She was shortlisted for the merit-based IB Diploma Scholarship worth INR  at Global Indian International School, Singapore. In 2009, she also received academic scholarship worth INR 800 by the International Children Equity Fund for excelling at national level in Math, Science and English in India.

She has actively participated in many math and science competitions. She participated in the American Mathematics Competition, Singapore Junior Chemistry Olympiad and the Indian National State Physics Olympiad (NSEP). She also took the Cayley Math Contest and the Galois Math Contest by the University of Waterloo, Canada.

In grade 10, Shubhavi took 7 CIE IGCSE exams as a private candidate while also attending regular IB school.

Film career 
Arya's interest in art and animation developed as a child. At the age of 12 years, she worked as an animator in animated short film "ZAP" which was screened at film festivals in Denmark and Serbia. In 2012, she got invited to Center for Animationspædagogik, The Animation Workshop, Viborg, Denmark where she created an animated film for the Viborg Animation Festival along with her brother. She later set out to develop her own materials for her own next project and after an unusually long development period, she completed Adventures of Malia in 2015.

She has experimented with different styles of animation. She has been praised by the jury of CINE Golden Eagle Awards for her exceptional talent in animation at the age of 16 years. Jury of the Underexposed Film Festival complimented her vibrant style of filmmaking and appreciated the treatments that Shubhavi brought to the film 'Adventures of Malia'. Other praise has included the jury of Insight Curation Scheme, United Kingdom who commended Shubhavi's distinctive animation style. Rock and Roll Film Festival 2015, Kenya agreed by saying "16-year-old, Shubhavi Arya, shows great promise as she writes, directs and animates "The Adventures of Malia". If she carries on like this, it won't be long before she is winning a lot of awards for her work."

Her film Adventures of Malia was accepted for screening in over 10 countries in over 30 international film festivals including the Chicago International Film Festival – Cine Youth, ENIMATION Little Elephant - International Children and Youth Film Festival, Slovenia, Kratka Forma – The International Festival of Short Films 2015, Serbia and the Arlington International Film Festival.It was the only Indian film to be a winner in the Global Independent Film Awards, United States in August 2015. It was the only selection from India at many international film festivals including the 51st Chicago International Film Festival – Cine Youth 2015, USA and Kratka Forma – The International Festival of Short Films 2015, Serbia. Adventures of Malia was the only film directed by an Under 18-year-old at the Twister Alley Film Festival 2015, USA.

Shubhavi is the youngest animator and film director in India to have had film screenings in over 30 international film festivals.

Filmography as director

Filmography as animator

Film awards and nominations 
{| class="wikitable" style="text-align: center"
|- style="background:#94bfd3;"
| colspan="7" style="text-align:center;"| 'Awards and nominations for Shubhavi Arya|-
! Year !! Association !! Country !! Award Category !! Status !! Film !! Role
|-
| 2015 || ColorTape International Film Festival ||  || Foreign Film – Honorary Mention ||  || Adventures of Malia || Director/Animator
|-
| 2015 || Twister Alley International Film Festival ||  || Best Family Short ||  || Adventures of Malia || Director/Animator
|-
| 2015 || Twister Alley International Film Festival ||  || Best Animated Short ||  || Adventures of Malia || Director/Animator
|-
| 2015 || Awareness Film Festival ||  || Merit Award of Awareness ||  || Adventures of Malia || Director/Animator
|-
| 2015 || TOFUZI – 7th International Festival of Animation Films ||  || Best Children Film ||  || Adventures of Malia || Director/Animator
|-
| 2015 || Global Independent Film Awards ||  || Best Environmental Film ||  || Adventures of Malia || Director/Animator
|-
| 2015 || Global Independent Film Awards ||  || Best Under 18 Filmmaker ||  || Adventures of Malia || Director/Animator
|-
| 2015 || Phoenix Film Festival Melbourne ||  || Best Animation ||  || Adventures of Malia || Director/Animator
|-
| 2015 || Phoenix Film Festival Melbourne ||  || Best Student Film ||  || Adventures of Malia || Director/Animator
|-
| 2015 || Phoenix Film Festival Melbourne ||  || Best of New Filmmakers ||  || Adventures of Malia || Director/Animator
|-
| 2015 || 9th International Chinh India Kids Film Festival and Forum ||  || Kids for Kids ||  || Adventures of Malia || Director/Animator
|-
| 2016 || Scout Film Festival ||  || Best in Animation ||  || Adventures of Malia || Director/Animator
|}

 Non-film work 
Shubhavi is accomplished in artistic roller skating and figure skating. She is a silver medalist in the Asian Open Roller Skating Championship and is a National level figure skater. She was the trainer and mentor for figure skating for the Indian delegation to Winter Special Olympics World Games 2013 in South Korea. The Indian team in figure skating won a gold medal, two silver medals and two bronze medals that year at the Winter Special Olympics World Games. Shubhavi also does ballet.

Shubhavi is fond of writing and advocacy related works. Shubhavi has been a member of the STAND Student Leadership Team since 2014. She is also a daily content contributor for Hello Flo and magazine writer for Her Culture and has written several articles for both. She is also a member of the American Society of News Editors-School Journalism.org Student Advisory Board.

She has also chaired several Model United Nations Conferences including the Harvard Model United Nations, Yale Model United Nations and Model United Nations of Lubeck. She was the Communications and Public Relations Manager for the Asian region in Reims International Model United Nations, France, a university level conference. In 2012, she also won Verbal Commendation Award at the United World College MUN.

She is talented in visual arts and painting. Her paintings have been held at several exhibitions including 'Tvak', 'Yellow Spring' and 'Sync'. She received Most Promising Artist Award for the 'Yellow Spring' exhibition. In 2013, she won international painting competition "Achieve Thru Art Singapore". More than 400,000 students in Singapore, approximately 100 nationalities participated in this visual art competition to win air tickets to 12 destinations around the world. Shubhavi's artwork 'Religions' was a winner of destination Chennai, India and her artwork 'Women of Different Countries' was a winner of destination Mumbai, India. Her artwork 'Festivals' was a winner of destination Delhi, India. She received 6 return tickets from Singapore to Delhi, Mumbai and Chennai as well as a $20 Changi Airport shopping voucher in the prize. In 2011, she also won second prize in India worth INR 10,000 in the 'Think Sydney Think Singapore Airlines' contest by Singapore Airlines. She is also pursuing a Diploma in painting from Rabindra Bharti University, India.

She has also spoken at several blood donation camps, Indian election campaigns and volunteered in many national campaigns of the Government of India including the Pulse Polio Immunization Program, Beti Bachao, Beti Padhao Yojana(Save the Girl Child, Educate the Girl Child) and Swachh Bharat Abhiyan(Indian Sanitation Mission)''.

References

External links 
 Official Site of Shubhavi Arya
 
 Facebook page of Adventures of Malia

Living people
Indian animators
Indian animated film directors
Indian animated film producers
1998 births
Indian women film directors
Indian women animators
Stop motion animators
Film directors from Delhi
Women artists from Delhi
Screenwriters from Delhi
Film producers from Delhi
21st-century Indian film directors
Indian women screenwriters
Indian women film producers
Businesswomen from Delhi